The Port of Ishinomaki is a Specified Class 3 Fishing Port located in Ishinomaki City, Miyagi Prefecture, Japan. The port holds the Guinness World Record for the worlds longest fish market, at 875.47 metres.

References 

Ishinomaki
Ishinomaki
Guinness World Records
Buildings damaged by the 2011 Tōhoku earthquake and tsunami